Ilker Soylu (born April 16, 1984, Istanbul, Turkey) better known for his stage name of Philogresz is a Turkish and Dutch electronic music record producer, multi-instrumentalist, teacher / lecturer, mastering and mixing engineer, based in Antwerp, Belgium.

With a career spanning nearly a decade covering genres from electronica to techno to jazzy minimal, he has released on respected electronic music labels like Ware, Treibstoff, both distributed by German electronic music distribution Kompakt. Philogresz is also known of his 2011 release on British label from Brighton; Bedrock Records. His single 'Move Me' on Progcity Deep Trax has been selected by Swiss DJ, record collector Gilles Peterson for his weekly radio-show on BBC Radio 1. His 2011 single 'Isolated Funk Ensemble' w/ Sarah Goldfarb on Treibstoff recordings has been picked by John Digweed for the prestigious mix / compilations series Structures (album)

2009 included performances at Awakenings Festival in Rotterdam - considered as one of the best techno festivals in Europe.

His Dusty Rides EP on Third Wave Black has been reviewed and tagged as a special and renewing record of 2009 by Debug

He owns record labels TEAM records (Techno, Tech house) and PHIL (electronica, Techno, House music), and has produced over 20 records since 2002.

From 2005 to date, Philogrez is an audio engineering lecturer at SAE Institute; regularly giving lectures in SAE Rotterdam, Amsterdam, Brussels and Istanbul.

Releases
 Mibonsai EP - Digitude Recordings - 2007
 Debut On Blackwarm EP - Team Records - 2008
 Sentiment EP - Sound Architecture - 2009
 Dusty Rides EP - Third Wave Black - 2009
 The Dark Side - Team Records - 2009
 Milestone EP - Ware / Kompakt - 2009
 So Long Sydney - Ware / Kompakt - 2010
 Just When You Think It's Over - Treibstoff / Kompakt - 2010
 Move Me - ProgCity Deep Trax - 2010
 Dependence Of Distant Us - Phil - 2010
 Thick Dean Remixes - Team Records - 2011
 Rebel The Corrupt - Snork Enterprises - 2011
 Peter Horrevorts & Philogresz - Return Of The Titans - Team Records - 2012
 Philogresz - The Lost Movie - Album - 2014

References

External links
 Official Philogresz website
 BBC.CO.UK
 Discogs
 Resident Advisor
 Thedjlist.com
 Debug (magazine)
 SAE Institute
 Istanbul.sae.edu
 SAE NL

Turkish record producers
Living people
1984 births